"Orgasm Addict'" is a song by the English punk rock band Buzzcocks. It was the A-side of the Buzzcocks' first single, with "Whatever Happened To...?" as the B-side, which was released on 4 November 1977 by record label United Artists.

Cover image
The sleeve was devised by graphic designer Malcolm Garrett and featured a collage, created by Linder Sterling, depicting a woman whose head is a clothes iron. Regarding the concept, Sterling explained: "Well, the iron came from an Argos catalogue and the female torso came from a photographic magazine called Photo. I never cleared the copyright but no one noticed, so it was alright." Sterling later added "It was made in a Salford bedroom; I had a sheet of glass, a scalpel and piles of women's mags." The image was originally in colour but Garrett thought it would be best to change it to a blue monotone, for the record company specified the sleeve could be printed in only two colours.

Release
"Orgasm Addict" was released as the Buzzcocks' debut single on 4 November 1977.

The 7" French vinyl release contains different takes of the same two tracks.

This was the only Buzzcocks single featuring bassist Garth Smith, who joined in early 1977 to replace Steve Diggle, who switched to guitar. Shortly after its release, he was expelled from the band.

The song later appeared on the album Singles Going Steady and also on CD reissues of Another Music in a Different Kitchen.

Reception
The song was controversial due to its sexual content and was banned by the BBC.

Buzzcocks singer Pete Shelley later said that the song "is embarrassing. It's the only one I listen to and... shudder".

Track listing
 "Orgasm Addict" (Howard Devoto, Pete Shelley) (1:58)
 "Whatever Happened To...?" (Pete Shelley, Dial – alias of ex-manager Richard Boon) (2:07)

References

External links
 

1977 singles
Buzzcocks songs
Songs written by Pete Shelley
Song recordings produced by Martin Rushent
Songs written by Howard Devoto
Obscenity controversies in music
1977 songs
United Artists Records singles